Midwest Radio Network is an Australian company which has a global media business concentrated in two main areas, broadcasting and digital media. The broadcasting division focuses on the operation of FM and AM commercial radio stations in the Midwest region, west of Sydney. The digital media platform comprising newspaper-style news portals is internationally concentrated.

Overview
Midwest Radio Network was founded on 7 June 1938 as Lithgow Broadcasters Pty Ltd and was granted a license to transmit that year. Initially the company was a subsidiary of Western Newspapers Pty Ltd. In July 1939 the company began broadcasting with the channel name 2LT as part of the Macquarie Central Western Network.

In the 1970s the company was acquired by the Transcontinental Broadcasting Company Limited. This in turn was bought by Broadcast Investments Pty Limited, the former owner of 2UE, in 1979. Late in 1979 Lithgow Broadcasters was transferred to interests associated with John McEvoy of the Metro Hotels group.

On 21 June 1984 the company changed its name to Midwest Radio Network Pty Ltd, and in 1986 became a major shareholder in a new Australian Securities Exchange listed public company called Midwest Radio Limited. Midwest Radio Limited was involved in a number of ventures during the 1980s and 1990s, including regional radio stations in New Zealand and FM broadcasting operations in the United Arab Emirates, Qatar and Bahrain.

In 1996 Midwest Radio Network established a new FM station which launched with the call sign Kiss FM, which it began operating in conjunction with 2LT, and servicing a similar coverage area.

In 2001 Midwest Radio Network cut most of its connections with Midwest Radio Limited when that company was taken over in a reverse takeover by Unitel, a former listed public company whose principal asset was a network of radio stations jointly owned with Rural Press Limited comprising River 94.9 in Ipswich, Queensland, and South Australian stations 5AU Port Augusta, 5RM in Renmark, 5CC Port Lincoln, 5CS in Port Pirie, Magic FM in Port Lincoln, and Magic FM in Renmark. Subsequently, the name of the public company was changed to Media Corporation Australia Limited.. Control of the radio assets had passed to MCA and Midwest Radio Network was now concentrating on online news portals.

However, in March 2006 Media Corporation Australia went into liquidation and asked Midwest Radio Network to appoint a receiver for the radio assets. Both stations were offered for sale but no buyers emerged. Four years later Midwest Radio Network terminated the receivership and resumed control of the radio stations.

History

Early days
After the license to establish 2LT was granted to Midwest Radio Network (then named Lithgow Broadcasters Pty Ltd) in 1938 it was proposed a trade union lease the license on a ten-year term basis, and for the union, the Professional Radio Employees Institute, to build and own the station, a first for a union in Australia. The proposal did not eventuate and Midwest proceeded to develop the station, building a transmitting aerial and a studio at Bowenfels. The station was to broadcast 10 hours a day initially.

Mast collapse
A contract for the erection of the tubular steel aerial mast, which was to be 218 feet in height was entered into in January 1939 while tenders were called for other buildings to be built. It was intended the mast would be finished in six weeks and the station would be on air by Easter 1939. The erection of the mast which had been extended to 228 feet in height was a disaster. A pulley failed causing the newly constructed mast to buckle and fall. It was extensively damaged. A new mast had to be commissioned which took two to three weeks to build. In the end the two contractors commissioned to erect the mast were unable to do so. The Mayor of Lithgow Bob Fullagar, who was Manager of the Lithgow State Mine at the time, took over the job and had the mast installed.

Official opening
The official opening of 2LT occurred on 2 July 1939. The station was opened by the Australian Minister for Customs Mr. J. N. Lawson, who in congratulating Midwest Radio Network (then Lithgow Broadcasters), said the Australian system of broadcasting provided greater variety, and unlike stations in Britain that were under government control, had greater freedom, "and freedom in broadcasting was just as important a bulwark as freedom of the press."

Station threatened by bushfires
In January 1940, six months after 2LT first went to air the station, along with a number of cottages and State Pine forests, was endangered by bushfires but survived without damage.

Australian Government censorship
On 13 May 1940 Australia's Postmaster-General imposed a restriction on 2LT preventing it from allowing two members of the Western Mining Federation to speak on the station because of ‘objectionable remarks’ including their description of the word ‘scab.’ The Postmaster General directed the two men be barred from speaking on the station again unless scripts of what they were to say were submitted to his department and approved beforehand. The minister also directed the station itself not be able to comment on industrial matters unless it followed the same procedure. He said he had directed the Crown Solicitor to investigate the powers of the government in such matters.

Station linked to communist threat
The Postmaster-General linked the station ban to his government's concern about communism infiltrating the unions. He was quoted as saying "there were only two classes of Australians today, those who were loyal to the country and those who were not." The Minister said anyone who had information that would assist the government in its fight against communism and enemy agents should, submit it to the nearest police station, or send it to him direct.

National coal mining strike
The Australian Government restriction imposed on 2LT occurred as a national coal mining strike was entering its third month, with most coal mines in Australia located in and around Lithgow. The strike brought unprecedented attention from the Australian Government as it had come in the midst of World War II and was depriving manufacturing plants focused on the development of military equipment and arms, including the Lithgow Small Arms Factory, of vitally needed coal supplies. Miners were being pressed by unions to stay on strike despite pleas from Prime Minister Robert Menzies that the War Effort was under threat. "If we do not obtain ample supplies of coal soon our war programme must be curtailed drastically", he said at the time. This is unthinkable when our strong and calculating enemy is throwing all resources into a terrific gamble for world domination", he said.

News services commenced
From February 1942 the Australian Broadcasting Commission by arrangement with the Federation of Commercial Broadcasters began providing news services to 2LT and other regional Australian stations free of charge.

Andrews Sisters banned
In December 1943 the 2LT general manager Desmond Day banned all forty records by the Andrews Sisters. At the time he said the standard of music on the station, which he took over as general manager 5 months earlier, was very low and consisted of nothing but "boogie-woogie and hot jazz." The Manager said at the time the War had increased the average age of listeners to 35 to 40, and he hadn't met anyone over the age of 35 that liked the Andrews Sisters. "I don’t believe in tom-toms. The people want melody and good vocalists", he said.

Plan to introduce commercial news service
Three news services a day covering national and international news were scheduled to commence in May 1945 on 2LT, on relay from 2GB Sydney, by arrangement with The Sydney Morning Herald. ‘The aim was to give an objective, balanced and entirely factual survey of overseas and Australian events as reliable as the Herald itself and free from comment of any kind except when a survey of press and other opinion on any event of importance abroad becomes in itself a matter of news interest. Aside from international and Australian news wires, it was noted The Sydney Morning Herald had correspondents in London, New York, India, and China, and war correspondents in Western and Southern Europe, the Supreme Allied Headquarters in Europe, and General MacArthur's headquarters in the Pacific

Australian Government blocks new news service
The Australian government however moved to block 2LT and other stations taking the new news service as it would replace the existing service provided by the government-controlled Australian Broadcasting Commission, which had been provided free of cost to the station since February 1942. The Acting Prime Minister Ben Chifley announced the Postmaster-General would refuse to provide landlines for the new service. For some stations however, including 2LT, the government would allow landlines to be allocated provided the stations agreed to also broadcast the ABC news.

First live boxing broadcast
In February 1946 2LT joined a network of 25 Macquarie Network and co-operative stations Australia-wide to broadcast a boxing match, which was the largest hook-up ever for a boxing match in Australia.

Statewide Food for Britain appeal
2LT assisted in a statewide appeal in February 1946 for the Food for Britain Fund.

Poisoned potatoes
On 1 December 1946, at the direction of Lithgow Police, 2LT broadcast a warning to thieves who had stolen a bag of potatoes from a farm at nearby Portland that the potatoes had been treated with copper sulphate poison. The police were concerned the thieves may have tried to sell the potatoes unaware they were poisoned.

Western Newspapers ownership threatened
Western Newspapers was the majority owner of Midwest Radio Network in 1948, at a time when the Australian government was being pressed to end the monopoly of broadcasting station ownership by newspaper groups, with parts of the Chifley Cabinet wanting station licenses re-allocated, or for all broadcasting to be nationalised.

Bloodhound joins 2LT search for missing boys
On 1 November 1950 an appeal on 2LT brought together 150 men to form search parties for two young boys who went missing in Lithgow. The search party later grew to 500 and was joined by a bloodhound who had earlier discovered the body of a 70-year-old man.

UK-based Mirror Group forced to sell
By 1952 Midwest Radio Network (then Lithgow Broadcasters Pty Ltd) which had one asset, 2LT, was majority-owned by Mirror Pictorial Assets, a subsidiary of the UK-based Mirror Newspaper Group. In 1952 the Australian parliament passed a law forbidding foreign companies from having a controlling interest in Australian radio stations. On 23 January 1953, Mirror announced it was disposing of its majority shareholdings in nine stations including 2LT. After the sale its interest in Midwest, and consequently 2LT, was reduced to 28.9%.

NSW North Coast flood appeal
Midwest Radio Network's 2LT joined Sydney station 2GB in February 1954 sending clothes to the flood-stricken New South Wales north coast after an appeal launched by Sydney Mayor Pat Hills.

Christmas Day 1956 bushfires
Bushfires were raging eight miles from the city of Lithgow on Christmas Day 1956 when 2LT broadcast a call for volunteers to fight the fires. As a result, a number of the fires, which until then were blazing unchecked, were able to be put out.

John Fairfax becomes major shareholder
In 1964 Midwest Radio Network was partially owned by London-based Associated Television. On 29 June 1964 Associated announced it had sold its interests in 6 radio stations and eight television stations. As a result of the sale John Fairfax became a substantial shareholder of Midwest whose only asset at the time remained 2LT.

New public company floated
In 1986 Midwest's radio interests were transferred to a newly established public company named Midwest Radio Limited, which was listed on the Australian Securities Exchange. Midwest retained a shareholding in the new company but the radio assets were under the control of the new entity.

Kiss FM launched
In 1996 KISS FM was established and began broadcasting that year.

2LT wins national Community Project award
2LT won the Single Major Specific Community Project in the 1997 Rawards (Radio Industry Awards) for a 900 2LT Road Safety Campaign.

Company begins development of online news services
In 2002 Midwest in conjunction with Big News Network and Mainstream Media began putting together a global network of news portals, extending news coverage to each major region, nation, city in the world and U.S. states as well as sites focused on business, sport, entertainment and various industries.

Takeover of public company
Midwest Radio Limited was taken over by former listed company Unitel Media Group Limited in a deal first proposed to the Australian Securities Exchange ominously on 11 September 2001. Unitel's primary asset was a 49.9% interest in Star Broadcasting Network, which owned and operated River 94.9 in Ipswich, Queensland, and a number of regional radio stations in South Australia. The deal closed on 18 June 2002. On 30 August 2002 the name of the public company was changed to 'Media Corporation Australia Limited'.

Surprise sale to Rural Press
Within months, in January 2003, Unitel Media, now owned by Media Corporation Australia, suddenly and surprisingly sold its Star Broadcasting Network holding to its joint venture partner Rural Press Limited. No price was disclosed, nor was any reason given for the sale.

Midwest appoints receiver to public company
In 2006 receivers were appointed to Media Corporation Australia Limited. Directors of that company requested Midwest Radio Network, which held a first charge over the company, to appoint a receiver which it did. The company's radio stations were operated by the receivers for four years during which time they attempted to sell the assets without success.

ACMA proposes technical specification variations
In January 2008 the Australian Communications & Media Authority proposed variations to the technical specifications of the company's broadcasting stations which would enable more people living in the Blue Mountains area to listen to the company's radio services.

Company takes back control of broadcasting assets
On 3 January 2010 Midwest Radio Network terminated the receivership of Media Corporation Australia Limited and took back control of the company's broadcasting stations.

Jennifer Menchin named Best News Presenter and Best Talk Presenter at ACRAs
Midwest Radio Network's Jennifer Menchin won the Best News Presenter and the Best Talk Presenter at the Australian Commercial Radio Awards (ACRAs), the national broadcasting industry awards presentation conducted by Commercial Radio Australia. The (ACRAs) are held annually by Commercial Radio Australia.

Current activity
Midwest Radio Network is now largely a management services and holding company which oversees various assets.

eNewspapers
In 2002 Midwest Radio Network helped establish and took over the running of the eNewspaper network of online news portals in conjunction with Big News Network. These portals use a newspaper presentation and name and each one is localised to a country, region, U.S. state or industry. A substantial portion of news content on the sites is drawn from Big News Network, a news agency headquartered at Dubai Media City in the United Arab Emirates. Other news content is provided by contracted news wires, contributors, and syndicated news content providers such as Newsmax Media and Financial Content. As part of an arrangement with Q Network the sites also feature movie reviews by James Kendrick who has been publishing reviews for Q Network since 1998. As of 2013 the network consists of over 100 portals. Some examples of the company's eNewspaper titles are Asia Bulletin, New York Telegraph, Australian Herald, San Diego Sun, London Mercury, Boston Star, California Telegraph, Texas Guardian, Florida Statesman, International Travel News and Business Sun. The eNewspaper network operated by Midwest is the second global network of news sites established in conjunction with Big News Network. That company also operates what it calls the News.Net directory of sites in tandem with Mainstream Media, which was established in 1996 and began development of the News.Net sites in 1999, which include such sites as US News.Net, Europe News.Net, China News.Net, Britain News.Net, Boston News.Net, Toronto News.Net, Miami News.Net, and Hong Kong News.Net. Midwest Radio Network and Mainstream Media share facilities and offices in Sydney, Dubai and Bahrain. The group has news desks in Sydney, Perth, Dubai and Delhi.

Radio

2LT

This station continues to be operated by the company and is now in its ninth decade of broadcasting. Midwest Radio Network was originally established to act as licensee for the station. Although the broadcasting license for 2LT was granted in June 1938 the station did not begin broadcasting until July 1939. The new station formed part of the Macquarie Central Western Network, and featured that network's programming as well as locally produced content. The station has been operating continuously since 1939 and now broadcasts to an extended coverage area which includes Lithgow, Bathurst, Oberon and other parts of the Central Tablelands in the Central West, as well as the Blue Mountains.

In 2011 Jennifer Menchin from 2LT won two Australian Commercial Radio Awards in the categories of best talk presenter and best news presenter.

Move FM

In 1996 Midwest Radio Network sought and was granted a license to establish an FM radio station to complement 2LT. The company was granted a license to broadcast on 95.3MHz and began operating as KISS 95.3. Later a frequency conflict with a Sydney station led to a change to 107.9 MHz and a name change. Finally in 2011 the station was renamed to MoveFM.

On 15 April 2004 MoveFM's former frequency was auctioned for $106 million by the Australian Broadcasting Tribunal. In exchange the Tribunal awarded Midwest two licenses for additional FM frequencies and areas, allowing them to extend coverage by operating translator stations in the Blue Mountains. Despite having been granted the licenses, extended works on the tower which is to site the antennas, and delays in obtaining satisfactory power and radiation pattern specifications, has delayed the official launch of the services, which are now not expected to be fully operational until 2022-23.

Other activity
The company also owns a hotel reservation website, which it claims is not a significant part of its business, and has land holdings in Port Macquarie and Geraldton.

Operations

Broadcasting
2LT AM radio station frequency 900 kHz servicing Lithgow, New South Wales, Bathurst, New South Wales, and Blue Mountains (New South Wales), Australia
Move FM radio station frequency 107.9 MHz servicing Lithgow, New South Wales, Bathurst, New South Wales and Blue Mountains (New South Wales), Australia
99.5 MHz FM translator servicing the Blue Mountains (New South Wales) west of Sydney (to be formally launched in 2022-23)
101.1 MHz FM translator servicing the Blue Mountains (New South Wales) west of Sydney (to be formally launched in 2022-23)

Online newspapers
Regions
 Africa Leader – covers the continent and major cities and countries of Africa
 Arab Herald – covers Arab speaking and Arab culture countries including GCC members
 Asia Bulletin – dedicated to the Asian region as a whole as well as individual countries
 Asia Pacific Star – focuses on China, Japan, the Korean Peninsula, Taiwan, the Philippines, and Oceania
 Caribbean Herald – links news from island nations in the Caribbean including Haiti, the Bahamas, Barbados, El Salvador, and Cuba
 Central Asia Times – features news from the former Soviet states with names ending with "stan" as well as Mongolia
 Europe Sun – a resource for news of the European Union and member nations
 Herald Globe – The group's international publication covering world news and business
 Middle East Star – monitors the Israeli–Palestinian conflict and other topics relevant to the region
 Southeast Asia Post – news from around Southeast Asia including from Vietnam, Cambodia, Nepal, Thailand, Singapore and Indonesia
Nations
 Afghanistan Sun – covers the country nationally and from an international perspective
 Argentina Star – includes major coverage from the capital Buenos Aires and other cities
 Australian Herald – national publication with coverage of Sydney, Melbourne, Perth, Brisbane, Adelaide, and the capital Canberra
 Bangladesh Sun – has its main emphasis on the country, Dhaka the capital, and the Southeast Asia region
 Brazil Sun – features news from across the country including São Paulo, the Federal capital Brasília, and Rio de Janeiro
 Cambodian Times – covering the Kingdom of Cambodia (formerly Kampuchea), with a main focus on the capital and largest city, Phnom Penh
 Canada Standard – national service with news from the major cities Toronto, Vancouver, Montreal and Quebec
 China National News – covers the nation and provinces Hong Kong and Macau
 Greek Herald – the main emphasis of this newspaper is on the Greek economy and events in Athens
 Haiti Sun – country portal with some coverage of other Caribbean nations
 India Gazette – national publication named after newspaper first published in 1780
 Iran Herald – claims to report independent news from and about the Islamic Republic of Iran
 Iraq Sun – publishes breaking news from across the nation and the capital Baghdad
 Irish Sun – covers Ireland, named after Dublin newspaper of 1880
 Israel Herald – news of the Jewish state with emphasis on the Middle East conflict
 Jamaican Times – displays news of the country and its largest city and capital Kingston
 Japan Herald – coverage of Japan and its bigger cities including Tokyo and Osaka
 Kenya Star – national coverage with substantial content related to events in Nairobi
 Malaysia Sun – breaks news from around the country and nearby islands
 Mexico Star – national stories together with news of Mexican interest from abroad
 Nepal National – long time English language resource for Nepal and its capital Kathmandu
 New Zealand Star – covers the North Island and South Island with national and local news
 Nigeria Sun – presents news for the Federal Republic of Nigeria
 North Korea Times – claims to be the oldest news website covering North Korea
 Pakistan Telegraph – originates and sources news for the country and cities like Karachi, Lahore and Islamabad
 Philippine Times – portal devoted to news about the Philippines, in particular Manila
 Russia Herald – features stories from around the nation and international articles pertinent to Russia
 Sierra Leone Times – Freetown-focused site with some focus on the West African region
 Singapore Star – portal concentrating on Singapore, uses The surprise of Asia as a slogan
 Sri Lanka Source – presents topical coverage of events in Sri Lanka and the capital Colombo
 Taiwan Sun – covers the island nation internally, its relationship with China, and the Asia-Pacific region
 The UK News – regional site with the main focus on England
 The US News – breaks national news and stories of US interest from around the world
 Trinidad Times – a site dedicated to Trinidad & Tobago with some regional coverage
 Venezuela Star – reports breaking news from Venezuela and its capital Caracas
 Vietnam Tribune – long-established portal focused on Vietnam and its capital Hanoi
 Zimbabwe Star – news portal servicing Zimbabwe which became independent from the UK in 1980
Cities
 Albuquerque Express – covering Albuquerque in New Mexico
 Atlanta Leader – focuses on Atlanta, has the slogan You can rely on the Leader
 Austin Globe – predominantly news of the Texan capital with some state coverage
 Baltimore Star – a news portal for Baltimore, Maryland
 Baton Rouge Post – primarily based on Baton Rouge with stories from around Louisiana
 Beijing Bulletin – composite news site for the northern China metropolis
 Birmingham Star – covers the city, and the state of Alabama
 Boston Star – Boston, named after the Boston Daily Star of 1845
 Buffalo Breeze – publication centers around the city, and the state of New York
 Charlotte Star – covers Charlotte and the state of North Carolina
 Chicago Chronicle – Chicago portal named after newspaper first published in 1880
 Cincinnati Sun – the voice of Cincinnati together with national and international news
 Cleveland Star – focuses on Cleveland with state coverage of Ohio
 Dallas Sun – Dallas publication with slogan Where the sun never sets
 Denver Sun – covering Denver, Colorado, publication claims to be the Gateway to the Rockies
 Detroit Star – news from around Detroit with segments from Michigan
 Dublin News – online newspaper version of a Dublin (Ireland) newspaper of 1858
 Hong Kong Herald – reports the news from the densely populated province of Hong Kong
 Houston Mirror – Houston, Texas, publication named after a newspaper published in 1928
 Indianapolis Post – covering Indianapolis, has same name as 1927 newspaper
 Kansas City Post – Kansas City, Missouri publication named after newspaper produced in 1906
 Knoxville Times – similar named newspaper of 1932 preceded this publication focused on Knoxville, Tennessee
 Las Vegas Herald – covers Las Vegas, the gaming capital of the world, and the state of Nevada
 London Mercury – carries on a newspaper tradition first established in 1682 in London, England
 Los Angeles Herald – based on a traditional newspaper first published in 1900
 Memphis Sun – presents news from Memphis, Tennessee
 Miami Mirror – news portal reporting on Miami and Miami-Dade County, Florida
 Milwaukee Sun – named after Milwaukee, Wisconsin newspaper of 1924
 Nashville Herald – Nashville, Tennessee portal named after 1831 newspaper
 New Orleans Sun – inspired by 1838 newspaper servicing New Orleans
 New York Telegraph – publishes news from and about New York City like its newspaper predecessor of 1845
 Oklahoma City Sun – covering Oklahoma City
 Orlando Echo – online newspaper focusing on Orlando and southeastern Florida
 Paris Guardian – covers Paris, France with European and international segments
 Perth Herald – news portal for Perth, the West Australian capital
 Peking Press – comprehensive site focused on Beijing and mainland China
 Philadelphia Herald – displays news from around Philadelphia
 Phoenix Herald – generates news coverage of the city and the state of Arizona
 Pittsburgh Star – covers the city and Pennsylvania state
 Raleigh Times – online news site adopting the name of an 1848 Raleigh, North Carolina newspaper
 Sacramento Sun – streams news of Sacramento, California similar to its newspaper predecessor of 1848
 Salt Lake City Sun – services Salt Lake City in Utah
 San Antonio Post – covers San Antonio
 San Diego Sun – publishing San Diego, California news using the name of a newspaper started in 1881
 San Francisco Star – portal with the name of a San Francisco newspaper of 1851
 San Jose Sun – focuses on San Jose, Silicon Valley and the Bay Area
 Seattle Bulletin – online version of similarly named newspaper produced in 1903
 Shanghai Sun – composite news portal devoted to China's largest city
 St Louis Star – St Louis, Missouri publication with the slogan Striving, seeking and unyielding
 Sydney Sun – publication with the title of a newspaper founded in 1910 in Sydney
 Tampa Star – serving Tampa and Hillsborough County, Florida
 Toronto Telegraph – focusing on the largest city in Canada, in the province of Ontario
 Tucson Post – named after a 1901 newspaper, the site covers Tucson, Arizona
 Tuscaloosa Times – Tuscaloosa, Alabama publication named after an 1872–1899 newspaper
 Vancouver Star – covering Vancouver, British Columbia and Canada with the slogan The voice of reason
US states
 Arizona Herald – provides state coverage with news of Phoenix, Tucson and other large cities
 California Telegraph – covers California with a focus on Los Angeles, San Francisco and San Diego
 Colorado Star – Colorado publication with the slogan Till our great mountain rivers run dry
 Florida Statesman – state news portal for Florida and its major cities and towns
 Hawaii Telegraph – services the Hawaiian Islands with a particular emphasis on Oahu
 Maine Mirror – Maine publication with the slogan Where America's day begins
 Maryland Leader – provides state coverage with appreciable coverage of Baltimore
 Massachusetts Sun – portal featuring news from around Massachusetts
 Michigan Sun – generates statewide news coverage of Michigan and its major cities
 New Jersey Telegraph – features news of Newark, Jersey City and New Jersey state
 New York Statesman – servicing the state of New York
 North Carolina Daily – portal featuring state news from North Carolina
 Ohio Standard – a resource for news of Ohio and the state's larger cities
 Oklahoma Star – has the slogan Oklahoma's own, covers Oklahoma state
 Oregon Telegraph – news site updating headlines from across Oregon
 Pennsylvania Sun – providing statewide coverage and news of bigger cities in Pennsylvania
 Tennessee Daily – online newspaper with the slogan Tennessee at its best
 Texas Guardian – covers Texas, with a focus on Dallas, Houston, and Austin
 Utah Independent – focuses on Utah state with much of its coverage of Salt Lake City
 Wisconsin Star – covers Wisconsin from the capital Madison to its largest city Milwaukee
Miscellaneous
 Breaking Property News – a global real estate journal
 Broadcast Communications – a news resource for the broadcasting and communications industries
 Business Sun – an international news resource focusing on business and finance
 Entertainment Sun – news portal for the show business industry
 International Technology – covers news of technology from around the world
 International Travel News – travel news resource, has the slogan With footprints around the globe
 Manufacturing Mirror – focuses on news in manufacturing and textiles
 Professional Autos – reports on events in the automotive industry
 Sports Sun – general sports news site with an international perspective
 Tennis Times –  devoted to the sport of tennis, has the slogan Game, set, match
 Travel Trade. Org – designed to cater for travel industry professionals

References

External links
Midwest Radio Network home page
MoveFM home page
2LT home page

Australian radio networks
Australian news websites
Australian companies established in 1938
Companies formerly listed on the Australian Securities Exchange
Internet properties established in 2002
Publications established in 2002
Publishing companies established in 1938
Companies based in Sydney
Radio stations in New South Wales
Mass media in New South Wales
Mass media companies established in 1938